Manulea pseudofumidisca is a moth of the family Erebidae. It is found in Russia, North Korea and China (Zhejiang, Hunan, Gansu).

The length of the forewings is 10.3–11.7 mm for males and about 13.9 mm for females. The forewings are dark greyish brown, with a wide bright yellow costal margin. The hindwings are yellow.

References

Moths described in 2011
Lithosiina